Roast pig refers to a number of dishes featuring pig that is roasted.

Examples include:

Siu yuk, in Cantonese (Chinese) cuisine
Tostón asado (also called cochinillo asado), in Spanish cuisine
Hornado, in Ecuadorian cuisine
Lechon, in Filipino cuisine

See also 
Pig roast
Suckling pig, for roast suckling pig

References